Irdens Exantus is a Canadian actor. He is most noted for his performance as Souverain in the 2015 film My Internship in Canada (Guibord s'en va-t-en guerre), for which he received a Canadian Screen Award nomination for Best Supporting Actor at the 4th Canadian Screen Awards, and won the Quebec Cinema Award for Best Supporting Actor at the 18th Quebec Cinema Awards.

My Internship in Canada was his first film role. He also performed in the 2016 feature 1:54, written and directed by Yan England.

On stage, he has appeared in productions of Fanny Britt's Mourir and Michel Garneau's Les neiges.

References

External links

Canadian male film actors
Canadian male television actors
Male actors from Quebec
Black Canadian male actors
Canadian people of Haitian descent
Living people
21st-century Canadian male actors
Year of birth missing (living people)
Best Supporting Actor Jutra and Iris Award winners